Agra dable is a species of carabid beetle. The holotype was collected in Costa Rica and first described to science in 2002.

Description
Agra dable measure 14.5–18.0 mm in length and 4.28–4.70 mm in width. They are coloured black and shiny, with the tips of the mandibles red. They are very similar to Agra solisi.

Etymology
Terry L. Erwin, who described the species, explained that the specific epithet of the binomial nomenclature is dable because "dable, is part of the Spanish word, agradable, meaning "pleasing."

Other species in the genus Agra named by Erwin include Agra liv, named after Liv Tyler, and Agra schwarzeneggeri, named after Arnold Schwarzenegger.

References

Lebiinae
Beetles of Central America
Endemic fauna of Costa Rica
Beetles described in 2002
Taxa named by Terry Erwin